Freestyle skiing at the 2014 Winter Olympics was held at the Rosa Khutor Extreme Park near Krasnaya Polyana, Russia. The ten events took place between 6–21 February 2014.

In April 2011 the International Olympic Committee approved the addition of the halfpipe event for both, men and women. In July 2011, slopestyle was also added to the program, therefore a total of four new events were added to the freestyle skiing program.

Competition schedule

The following is the competition schedule for all ten events.

All times are (UTC+4).

Medal summary

Medal table

Men's events

Women's events

Qualification

A maximum of 282 quota spots were available to athletes to compete at the games. A maximum of 26 athletes could be entered by a National Olympic Committee, with a maximum of 14 men or 14 women. The five different events had different quota amounts allocated to them.

Participating nations
276 athletes from 30 nations participated, with number of athletes in parentheses. Four nations, Belgium, Brazil, The British Virgin Islands and Chile made their Olympic debuts in the sport. Paraguay made its first appearance at the Winter Olympics, with its only athlete competing in freestyle skiing.

Controversy
Both Canada and Slovenia both appealed separately to the Court of Arbitration for Sport that the three French athletes in the Big Final of the men's ski cross final, had their pants illegally changed by their coach. They argued it gave the three an aerodynamic advantage over the rest of the field. Both countries first appealed to the International Ski Federation, but were rejected since they appealed hours after the end of the competition (when the deadline was 15 minutes after the close of the race). The appeal to the court was ultimately unsuccessful as well, because the Court agreed with the ski federation that the appeal was filed past the deadline.

Notes
Alexandre Bilodeau became the first freestyle skiing gold medalist to defend his Olympic title, winning the men's moguls, following up his 2010 Olympics gold in men's moguls. Justine Dufour-Lapointe became the youngest freestyle skiing Olympic champion ever in the women's mogul event.

References

External links
Official Results Book – Freestyle Skiing

 
2014
Freestyle skiing
Winter Olympics
Freestyle skiing competitions in Russia